New Haven is a village in Gallatin County, Illinois, United States, along the Little Wabash River near its mouth at the Wabash River. The population was 433 at the 2010 United States Census, down from 477 at the 2000 census.

History
Before the New Haven vicinity was settled, it was inhabited by multiple indigenous cultures. Some countryside southeast of the village near the Wabash was formerly the location of a village of a Late Woodland people known as the "Duffy Complex"; the location is now an archaeological site known as the Duffy site.

Geography
New Haven is located in the northeast corner of Gallatin County at  (37.907113, -88.126954). It is bordered to the north by White County, and the Little Wabash River forms part of the northern border.

Demographics

At the 2000 census, there were 477 people, 203 households and 138 families residing in the village. The racial makeup of the village was 99.58% White, and 0.42% from two or more races. Hispanic or Latino of any race were 1.05% of the population.

There were 203 households, of which 28.1% had children under the age of 18 living with them, 54.7% were married couples living together, 11.3% had a female householder with no husband present, and 32.0% were non-families. 27.6% of all households were made up of individuals, and 10.3% had someone living alone who was 65 years of age or older.  The average household size was 2.35 and the average family size was 2.90.

23.1% of the population were under the age of 18, 8.0% from 18 to 24, 23.9% from 25 to 44, 28.5% from 45 to 64, and 16.6% who were 65 years of age or older. The median age was 41 years. For every 100 females, there were 97.9 males. For every 100 females age 18 and over, there were 90.2 males.

The median household income was $27,083 and the median family income was $29,875. Males had a median income of $25,000 and females $19,500. The per capita income was $12,367. About 20.3% of families and 22.6% of the population were below the poverty line, including 24.8% of those under age 18 and 11.3% of those age 65 or over.

References

Further reading
 1887. History of Gallatin, Saline, Hamilton, Franklin and Williamson Counties, Illinois. Chicago: Goodspeed Publishing Co.
 Musgrave, Jon, ed. 2002. Handbook of Old Gallatin County and Southeastern Illinois]. Marion, Ill.: [http://www.illinoishistory.com/ IllinoisHistory.com. 464 pages.

External links
 New Haven https://web.archive.org/web/20020823054622/http://www.lth6.k12.il.us/schools/gallatin/new_haven.htm

Villages in Gallatin County, Illinois
Villages in Illinois